Magín Berenguer (1918–2000) was an Asturian architect, painter, archaeologist, and intellectual.

20th-century Spanish archaeologists
20th-century Spanish painters
20th-century Spanish male artists
Spanish male painters
Painters from Asturias
People from Oviedo
1918 births
2000 deaths
20th-century Spanish architects